Ga-eul, also spelled Ka-eul, is a Korean feminine given name. Unlike most Korean names, which are composed of two Sino-Korean roots each written with one hanja, "Gaeul" is an indigenous Korean name: a single word meaning "autumn". It is one of a number of such indigenous names which became more popular in South Korea in the late 20th century.

People
People with this name include:
 Jeon Ga-eul (born 1988), South Korean footballer
 Kim Ga-eul (born 1997), South Korean swimmer

See also
List of Korean given names

References

Given names
Korean feminine given names